Bruno Miguel Santos Leite (born 26 March 1995) is a Cape Verdean footballer who plays as a midfielder for Haugesund. Born in Portugal, Leite represent the Cape Verde national football team internationally. He also holds Norwegian citizenship.

Club career
On 28 November 2016, Leite signed a three-and-a-half-year contract with FK Haugesund.

International career
Graça made his international debut for Cape Verde national football team in a 3-0 2019 Africa Cup of Nations qualification win over Tanzania on 12 October 2018.

Career statistics

Club

References

External links
Haugesund Profile 

1995 births
Living people
Cape Verdean footballers
Cape Verde international footballers
Portuguese footballers
Portuguese people of Cape Verdean descent
Norwegian footballers
Association football midfielders
Skeid Fotball players
FK Haugesund players
Eliteserien players
Pafos FC players
Cypriot First Division players
Cape Verdean expatriate footballers
Portuguese expatriate footballers
Norwegian expatriate footballers
Cape Verdean expatriate sportspeople in Cyprus
Portuguese expatriate sportspeople in Cyprus
Norwegian expatriate sportspeople in Cyprus
Expatriate footballers in Cyprus
Footballers from Lisbon